Yeshivish, also known as Yeshiva English, Yeshivisheh Shprach, or Yeshivisheh Reid, is a sociolect of English spoken by Yeshiva students and other Jews with a strong connection to the Orthodox Yeshiva world.

"Yeshivish" may also refer to non-Hasidic Haredi Jews. Sometimes it has an extra connotation of non-Hasidic Haredi Jews educated in yeshiva and whose education made a noticeable specific cultural impact onto them. In the latter case the term has ambivalent (both positive and negative) connotations comparable to these of the term "academic".

The term appears to be a portmanteau word of yeshiva and English, however, it may simply be formed from yeshiva + the adjectival suffix -ish.

Research
Only a few serious studies have been written about Yeshivish. The first is a master's thesis by Steven Ray Goldfarb (University of Texas at El Paso, 1979) called "A Sampling of Lexical Items in Yeshiva English." The work lists, defines, and provides examples for nearly 250 Yeshivish words and phrases. The second, more comprehensive work is Frumspeak: The First Dictionary of Yeshivish by Chaim Weiser. Weiser (1995) maintains that Yeshivish is not a pidgin, creole, or an independent language, nor is it precisely a jargon. Baumel (2006) following Weiser notes that Yeshivish differs from English primarily in phonemic structure, lexical meaning, and syntax.

Benor (2012) offers a detailed list of distinctive features used in Yeshivish. Katz describes it in Words on Fire: the Unfinished Story of Yiddish (2004) as a "new dialect of English", which is "taking over as the vernacular in everyday life in some ... circles in America and elsewhere". Heilman (2006) and others consider code-switching a part of Yeshivish. Though Kaye (1991) would exclude English speakers in the context of a Yeshiva, studying the Talmud, from code-switching where he considers the terms "Yiddish English" or "Yiddishized English" ("= Yinglish") may be more appropriate.

Relation to other languages

English

The English variant of Yeshivish consists of grammatical irregularities borrowed from Yiddish, and a vocabulary consisting of Yiddish, Mishnaic Hebrew, Jewish Babylonian Aramaic, and sometimes Modern Hebrew. The speaker will use those terms instead of their English counterpart, either because of cultural affinity, or lack of the appropriate English term.

Yiddish

The Yiddish variant of Yeshivish is questionable as a definition in itself, since the grammar remains identical to that of Yiddish. It may be argued that the Yiddish variant of Yeshivish is a new phenomenon, and consists of fewer Germanic terms and more Aramaic and Rabbinical Hebrew.

Yiddish as portrayed in academia concentrates on the secular and cultural variants of Yiddish, and may be attributed to the fact that YIVO, the forerunner of Yiddish as an academic study, was founded by Jewish secularists.

The "Yeshivish" dialect of Yiddish has existed for quite a few centuries among Yeshiva-educated Jews in Eastern and Central Europe. However, as a result of the Holocaust, World War II and immigration, the secular Yiddish-speaking community is very small, and is far outnumbered by religious Yiddish-speaking communities in New York City, Los Angeles, Antwerp, Jerusalem, Bnei Brak, London and others, making the Yeshivish variant the predominant contemporary Yiddish dialect.

Hebrew
The Yeshivish dialect of Hebrew consists of occasional Ashkenazic pronunciation and various Yiddishisms within Modern Hebrew spoken among Haredi communities in Israel. While many terms from the Talmud and Mishna exist in Modern Hebrew, their pronunciation is often in line with Modern Hebrew, whereas in the Yeshivish variant, they are pronounced in the traditional Ashkenazic way.

Some Yiddishisms present in Yeshivish Hebrew are not distinct to the Yeshivish dialect and can be found in mainstream Modern Hebrew as well.

Patterns of usage
Yeshivish is primarily a male-spoken dialect. Fathers and sons, particularly of teenage years and above, might speak Yeshivish, while mothers and daughters generally speak a milder variety of it, which generally features Yeshivish phonology but excludes many Talmudic words. This can be explained as much of the Yeshivish lexicon is learned in Yeshiva where the studying takes place using a specialist nomenclature. Familiarity with these terms develops and they are then re-applied to other situations. There is a higher incidence of Yeshivish being spoken amongst Orthodox Jews that are regularly involved in Torah study, or belong to a community that promotes its study.

Commonly used platitudes amongst Orthodox Jews are frequently expressed with their Yeshivish equivalent. Examples include using shkoyakh for "thank you", a contraction from the Hebrew  "Yishar Koach", which literally translates as "May your strength be firm" and is used to indicate to someone that they have done a good job, and Barukh HaShem (sometimes written as B"H, using the quotation mark used for abbreviations in Hebrew), meaning "Blessed is HaShem [The Name (of God)]". Yeshivish dialogue may include many expressions that refer to HaShem.

Some observers predict that the English variant of Yeshivish may develop further to the point that it could become one of the historical Judeo-hybrid languages like Yiddish, Judeo-Spanish or the Judeo-Arabic languages. Judeo-hybrid languages were spoken dialects which mixed elements of the local vernacular, Hebrew, Aramaic and Jewish religious idioms. As Yiddish was to Middle High German, Yeshivish may be to Standard American English. However, the integration of modern-day Jews with non-Jews may keep their speech from diverging as far from the standard language as it did in the past.

Distinct features

Vocabulary
 
The vocabulary and grammatical structure of Yeshivish are drawn primarily from the speaker's native language (see above), although the vocabulary includes scholarly jargon, primarily from the Talmud and Acharonim in Yiddish, Hebrew, and Aramaic. In many sentences, however, the grammatical and lexical features of the speaker's native language are slight and sometimes even lacking altogether.

A distinguishing feature of Yeshivish is that its speakers knowingly apply highly technical and literal written language to a colloquial language and in common day usage, similar to Modern Hebrew, for example:

He was goirem Asach nezek, but basoif was moideh b'miktzas and tayned he was shoigeg

Goirem means to cause.

Tayned means to claim.

Asach means "a lot" (in Yiddish).

Nezek in its original context refers to the Talmudic notion of tort law.

Basoif means "eventually" (more precisely, "at the end").

Moideh b'miktzas refers to partial confession of a defendant.

And shoigeg in its original context means an incident which was caused unwillingly, but was a result of partial negligence.

Despite its heavy borrowing of technical and legal terms, the above sentence would be understood clearly by speakers of Yeshivish as "He did a lot of damage, and eventually admitted that he did it, although he claimed it was inadvertent."

In the above example, shoigeg does not have the same meaning in Yeshivish as it does in its original context, wherein it implies negligence. Oines would be the correct technical term.

Phonology

The Yeshivish accent has similarities to various accents of Eastern European and New York backgrounds. One notable feature of Yeshivish is the frequency of occurrence of the phoneme [x], common in many words of Hebrew, Aramaic, and Yiddish origin.

/t/ may be released when in general American it would be flapped or unreleased. Final stops may devoice and pre-nasal /æ/ may not raise.

Discourse and prosody
Yeshivish may use a "chanting intonation" for reading and discussing Jewish texts. A number of other distinctive intonations are also used: for instance, a high-falling pitch boundary for a dramatic point.

A hesitation click is used, borrowed from Israeli Hebrew:
 But sometimes it's more—[click] I don't know how to explain it.
The "click" is often vocalized as "tsk."

Yeshivish has some unique interjections. For instance Oh!, Ooh-aah! and Psshhhh! may be used as praise markers. Extensive hand motions, in particular thumb dipping in the style of talmudic discourse as well as the "fist twist," which is a loosely closed fist raised at or above eye level and twisted back and forth to indicate uncertainty or doubt, are common.

Grammar

Morphology
Loan words are often given plurals using standard English morphology. For instance, the plural of yeshiva is yeshivas rather than yeshivois as in Ashkenazi Hebrew (although this is similar to the plural form in Yiddish). Hebrew nouns ending in -us are pluralized with the suffix -in rather than replacing -us with -uyois as in Ashkenazi Hebrew, e.g. shlichus > shlichusin 'mission' and mashmaus > mashmausin 'implication'. This likely comes from the Yiddish plural marker -n although it could also have derived from Aramaic -in.

Loan verbs may also conjugate with standard English patterns. For example, Yiddish derived daven 'pray' may become davening or davened, e.g. "I already davened mincha." and "Quiet, I'm davening."

Syntax and semantics
Some verbs, particularly those of Hebrew origin, are often treated as participles, and inflected by English auxiliary verbs, in the same way that periphrastic verbs are constructed in Yiddish. For example:

He was moideh that he was wrong.
'He admitted that he was wrong.'
He was puts moideh – "to admit" – into the third-person singular past tense
We'll always be soimech on Rav Plony's p'sak that the eruv is kosher.
'We'll always rely upon Rabbi So-and-So's ruling that the eruv is usable.'
We'll always be puts soimech – 'to rely' – into the first-person plural future tense

There are a number of phrasal verbs calqued from Yiddish, for instance bring down and tell over 'recount, retell (a story)'.

Modals may be used differently than in standard English, e.g. I want that you should get her number.

There are a number of differences between the use of prepositions in Yeshivish and standard English:

The preposition by has a wide array of meanings in Yeshivish:
Are you eating by Rabbi Fischer? (at the house of)
By Chabad, it's different. (with, among)

A possible cause for this is that the Yiddish preposition "bei" is defined as at, beside or by. The similar-sounding English preposition by has come to encompass these meanings.

Prepositions are often dropped:
Her bus gets in 10:15.
''I'm already frum [religious] 20 years.

See also
 Hebraization of English
 Klezmer-loshn
 Yeshiva
 Yiddish words used in English

References

Bibliography
 Yeshivish, the language of Talmud Study

External links
 DafYomi.org, with extensive lectures on Talmud in Yeshivish English

 
Orthodox Judaism
Yiddish
Yiddish words and phrases
Dialects of English
Language varieties and styles
Sociolinguistics
Macaronic language